Mount Van Veen is a precipitous, mainly ice-free mountain rising to 1,510 m at the south side of Jupiter Amphitheatre in the Morozumi Range. It was mapped by the United States Geological Survey (USGS) from surveys and U.S. Navy air photos, 1960–63, and was named by the Advisory Committee on Antarctic Names (US-ACAN) for Richard C. Van Veen, a United States Antarctic Research Program (USARP) geologist at McMurdo Station, 1967–68.

Mountains of Victoria Land
Pennell Coast